The novels in the Higurashi When They Cry series are written by Ryukishi07, and are based on the visual novel series of the same name by 07th Expansion. There are four light novels which contain additional illustrations by five different artists, and seventeen novelizations of the separate visual novel arcs.

The light novels were all released as limited editions not sold in stores. The first one, Nekogoroshi-hen, was illustrated by Karin Suzuragi, Yutori Hōjō, and Jirō Suzuki, and was sent out to those who bought the first volume of the manga versions of Onikakushi-hen, Watanagashi-hen, and Tatarigoroshi-hen. One needed to send the cut out stamps in all three of these manga by the deadline in order to receive this special short story. The second light novel, Kuradashi-hen, was illustrated by Tonogai Yoshiki, Karin Suzuki, Yutori Hōjō, and Mimori. This novel was sent out to those who bought the second volume of the manga version of Himatsubushi-hen, and the first volumes of the manga Tsumihoroboshi-hen, Meakashi-hen, and Yoigoshi-hen. One needed to send the cut out stamps in all four of these manga by a certain deadline in order to receive this special short story. The third light novel, Hajisarashi-hen, contained illustrations by Rato, and was included with the limited edition of the PlayStation 2 game Higurashi no Naku Koro ni Matsuri.  The fourth novel, Kuradashi-hen Zoku is a sequel to Kuradashi-hen and was sent out to those who bought the second volumes of the manga Tsumihoroboshi-hen, Meakashi-hen, and Yoigoshi-hen. One needed to send the cut out stamps in all four of these manga by a certain deadline in order to receive this special short story. The light novels were published by Square Enix and released in 2006 and 2007.

Kodansha Box released seventeen novelizations of the visual novel arcs between August 2007 and March 2009, starting with Onikakushi-hen and ending with Higurashi no Naku Koro ni Rei. Most of the story arcs are divided into two volumes, except for Himatsubushi-hen and Higurashi no Naku Koro ni Rei which are compiled into one volume each, and Matsuribayashi-hen which is compiled into three volumes. The novels included illustrations by Tomohi.

Volume list

Light novels

Novelizations

References

External links
Novel official website 

Novels
Higurashi When They Cry